Bernie is a city in southern Stoddard County, Missouri, United States. The population was 1,958 at the 2010 census.

History
Bernie was laid out in 1890, and named after Bernice "Bernie" Crumb, the daughter of an early Euro-American settler. A post office called Bernie has been in operation since 1889. The city was incorporated in 1889. Bernie was situated along the St. Louis Southwestern Railway.

Geography
Bernie is located almost in the Missouri Bootheel, eight miles south of Dexter and approximately nine miles north of Malden on Missouri Route 25. The St. Francis River is about ten miles to the west on Missouri Route U.

Demographics

As of 2000 the median income for a household in the city was $24,085, and the median income for a family was $30,847. Males had a median income of $24,922 versus $16,196 for females. The per capita income for the city was $13,096. About 15.8% of families and 26.6% of the population were below the poverty line, including 28.1% of those under age 18 and 28.3% of those age 65 or over.

2010 census
As of the census of 2010, there were 1,958 people, 831 households, and 549 families residing in the city. The racial makeup of the city was 94.89% White, 2.20% Black or African American, 0.61% Native American, 0.10% Asian, 0.77% from other races, and 1.43% from two or more races. Hispanic or Latino of any race were 1.43% of the population.

There were 831 households, of which 32.1% had children under the age of 18 living with them, 47.4% were married couples living together, 13.6% had a female householder with no husband present, 5.1% had a male householder with no wife present, and 33.9% were non-families. 29.1% of all households were made up of individuals, and 14.7% had someone living alone who was 65 years of age or older. The average household size was 2.36 and the average family size was 2.91.

The median age in the city was 40 years. 24.5% of residents were under the age of 18; 8.2% were between the ages of 18 and 24; 23.9% were from 25 to 44; 26.2% were from 45 to 64; and 17.3% were 65 years of age or older. The gender makeup of the city was 47.1% male and 52.9% female.

Education
Bernie R-XIII School District operates one elementary school and Bernie Junior High/High School.

The town has a lending library, the Bernie Public Library.

Notable people
 Carl Edward Bailey, 31st Governor of Arkansas from 1937 to 1941, was born in Bernie in 1894. 
 Narvel Felts, a member of the Rockabilly Hall of Fame, attended Bernie High School.
 James Morton Smith, director of the Wisconsin Historical Society and Winterthur Museum; born in Bernie in 1919.

References

External links

 City website
 Historic maps of Bernie in the Sanborn Maps of Missouri Collection at the University of Missouri

Cities in Stoddard County, Missouri
1890 establishments in Missouri
Cities in Missouri